Çamlıca is a village in Mut district of Mersin Province, Turkey. It is on the road connecting Mut to Ermenek. Population of Çamlıca was 492  as of 2012.

References

Villages in Mut District